A virtual community is a social network of individuals who connect through specific social media, potentially crossing geographical and political boundaries in order to pursue mutual interests or goals. Some of the most pervasive virtual communities are online communities operating under social networking services.

Howard Rheingold discussed virtual communities in his book, The Virtual Community, published in 1993. The book's discussion ranges from Rheingold's adventures on The WELL, computer-mediated communication, social groups and information science. Technologies cited include Usenet, MUDs (Multi-User Dungeon) and their derivatives MUSHes and MOOs, Internet Relay Chat (IRC), chat rooms and electronic mailing lists. Rheingold also points out the potential benefits for personal psychological well-being, as well as for society at large, of belonging to a virtual community. At the same time, it showed that job engagement positively influences virtual communities of practice engagement.

Virtual communities all encourage interaction, sometimes focusing around a particular interest or just to communicate. Some virtual communities do both. Community members are allowed to interact over a shared passion through various means: message boards, chat rooms, social networking World Wide Web sites, or virtual worlds. Members usually become attached to the community world, logging in and out on sites all day every day, which can certainly become an addiction.

Introduction
The traditional definition of a community is of geographically circumscribed entity (neighborhoods, villages, etc.).  Virtual communities are usually dispersed geographically, and therefore are not communities under the original definition. Some online communities are linked geographically, and are known as community websites. However, if one considers communities to simply possess boundaries of some sort between their members and non-members, then a virtual community is certainly a community. Virtual communities resemble real life communities in the sense that they both provide support, information, friendship and acceptance between strangers. Being in a virtual community space you may be expected to feel a sense of belonging and a mutual attachment among the members that are in your space.

One of the most influential part about virtual communities is the opportunity to communicate through several media platforms or networks. Now that virtual communities exists, this had leveraged out the things we once did prior to virtual communities, such as postal services, fax machines, and even speaking on the telephone. Early research into the existence of media-based communities was concerned with the nature of reality, whether communities actually could exist through the media, which could place virtual community research into the social sciences definition of ontology. In the seventeenth century, scholars associated with the Royal Society of London formed a community through the exchange of letters. "Community without propinquity", coined by urban planner Melvin Webber in 1963 and "community liberated", analyzed by Barry Wellman in 1979 began the modern era of thinking about non-local community.  As well, Benedict Anderson's Imagined Communities in 1983, described how different technologies, such as national newspapers, contributed to the development of national and regional consciousness among early nation-states. Some authors that built their theories on Anderson's Imagined communities have been critical of the concept, claiming that all communities are based on communication and that virtual/real dichotomy is disintegrating, making use of the word "virtual" problematic or even obsolete.

Purpose

Virtual communities are used for a variety of social and professional groups; interaction between community members vary from personal to purely formal. For example, an email distribution list could serve as a personal means of communicating with family and friends, and also formally to coordinate with coworkers.

User experience testing to determine social codes 
User experience is the ultimate goal for the program or software used by an internet community, because user experience will determine the software's success. The software for social media pages or virtual communities is structured around the users’ experience and designed specifically for online use.
User experience testing is utilized to reveal something about the personal experience of the human being using a product or system. When it comes to testing user experience in a software interface, three main characteristics are needed: a user who is engaged, a user who is interacting with a product or interface, and defining the users’ experience in ways that are and observable or measurable.
User experience metrics are based on a reliability and repeatability, using a consistent set of measurements to result in comparable outcomes. User experience metrics are based on user retention, using a consistent set of measurements to collect data on user experience. 
The widespread use of the Internet and virtual communities by millions of diverse users for socializing is a phenomenon that raises new issues for researchers and developers. The vast number and diversity of individuals participating in virtual communities worldwide makes it a challenge to test usability across platforms to ensure the best overall user experience.  Some well-established measures applied to the usability framework for online communities are speed of learning, productivity, user satisfaction, how much people remember using the software, and how many errors they make.
The human computer interactions that are measured during a usability experience test focus on the individuals rather than their social interactions in the online community. The success of online communities depend on the integration of usability and social semiotics. Usability testing metrics can be used to determine social codes by evaluating a user's habits when interacting with a program. Social codes are established and reinforced by the regular repetition of behavioral patterns. People communicate their social identities or culture code through the work they do, the way they talk, the clothes they wear, their eating habits, domestic environments and possessions, and use of leisure time. Usability testing metrics can be used to determine social codes by evaluating a user's habits when interacting with a program.The information provided during a usability test can determine demographic factors and help define the semiotic social code. Dialogue and social interactions, support information design, navigation support, and accessibility are integral components specific to online communities. As virtual communities grow, so do the diversity of their users. However, the technologies are not made to be any more or less intuitive. Usability tests can ensure users are communicating effectively using social and semiotic codes while maintaining their social identities. Efficient communication requires a common set of signs in the minds of those seeking to communicate. As technologies evolve and mature, they tend to be used by an increasingly diverse set of users. This kind of increasing complexity and evolution of technology doesn't necessarily mean that the technologies are becoming easier to use. Usability testing in virtual communities can ensure users are communicating effectively through social and semiotic codes and maintenance of social realities and identities.

Effects

On health

Concerns with a virtual community's tendency to promote less socializing include: verbal aggression and inhibitions, promotion of suicide and issues with privacy. However, studies regarding the health effects of these communities did not show any negative effects. There was a high drop-out rate of participants in the study.

Recent studies have looked into development of health related communities and their impact on those already suffering health issues.  These forms of social networks allow for open conversation between individuals who are going through similar experiences, whether themselves or in their family. Such sites have so grown in popularity that now many health care providers form groups for their patients by providing web areas where one may direct questions to doctors. These sites prove especially useful when related to rare medical conditions. People with rare or debilitating disorders may not be able to access support groups in their physical community, thus online communities act as primary means for such support. Online health communities can serve as supportive outlets as they facilitate connecting with others who truly understand the disease, as well as offer more practical support, such as receiving help in adjusting to life with the disease. Each patient on online health communities are on there for different reasons, as some may need quick answers to questions they have, or someone to talk to.Involvement in social communities of similar health interests has created a means for patients to develop a better understanding and behavior towards treatment and health practices. Some of these users could have very serious life-threatening issues which these personal contexts could become very helpful to these users, as the issues are very complex. Patients increasingly use such outlets, as this is providing personalized and emotional support and information, that will help them and have a better experience. The extent to which these practices have effects on health are still being studied.

Studies on health networks have mostly been conducted on groups which typically suffer the most from extreme forms of  diseases, for example cancer patients, HIV patients, or patients with other life-threatening diseases.  It is general knowledge that one participates in online communities to interact with society and develop relationships.  Individuals who suffer from rare or severe illnesses are unable to meet physically because of distance or because it could be a risk to their health to leave a secure environment. Thus, they have turned to the internet.

Some studies have indicated that virtual communities can provide valuable benefits to their users. Online health-focused communities were shown to offer a unique form of emotional support that differed from event-based realities and informational support networks. Growing amounts of presented material show how online communities affect the health of their users.  Apparently the creation of health communities has a positive impact on those who are ill or in need of medical information.

On civic participation
It was found that young individuals  are more bored with politics and history topics, and instead are more interested in celebrity dramas and topics. Young individuals claim that ‘voicing what you feel’, doesn’t mean you are ‘being heard’, so they feel the need to not participate in these engagements, as they believe they aren’t being listened to anyway. Over the years, things have changed, as new forms of civic engagement and citizenship have emerged from the rise of social networking sites. Networking sites act as a medium for expression and discourse about issues in specific user communities. Online content-sharing sites have made it easy for youth as well as others to not only express themselves and their ideas through digital media, but also connect with large networked communities. Within these spaces, young people are pushing the boundaries of traditional forms of engagement such as voting and joining political organizations and creating their own ways to discuss, connect, and act in their communities.

Civic engagement through online volunteering has shown to have positive effects on personal satisfaction and development. Some 84 percent of online volunteers found that their online volunteering experience had contributed to their personal development and learning.

On communication
In his book The Wealth of Networks from 2006, Yochai Benkler suggests that virtual communities would "come to represent a new form of human communal existence, providing new scope for building a shared experience of human interaction". Although Benkler's prediction has not become entirely true, clearly communications and social relations are extremely complex within a virtual community. The two main effects that can be seen according to Benkler are a "thickening of preexisting relations with friends, family and neighbours" and the beginnings of the "emergence of greater scope for limited-purpose, loose relationships". Despite being acknowledged as "loose" relationships, Benkler argues that they remain meaningful.

Previous concerns about the effects of Internet use on community and family fell into two categories: 1) sustained, intimate human relations "are critical to well-functioning human beings as a matter of psychological need" and 2) people with "social capital" are better off than those who lack it. It leads to better results in terms of political participation. However, Benkler argues that unless Internet connections actually displace direct, unmediated, human contact, there is no basis to think that using the Internet will lead to a decline in those nourishing connections we need psychologically, or in the useful connections we make socially. Benkler continues to suggest that the nature of an individual changes over time, based on social practices and expectations. There is a shift from individuals who depend upon locally embedded, unmediated and stable social relationships to networked individuals who are more dependent upon their own combination of strong and weak ties across boundaries and weave their own fluid relationships. Manuel Castells calls this the 'networked society'.

On Identity 
In 1997, MCI Communications released the "Anthem" advertisement, heralding the internet as a utopia without age, race, or gender. Lisa Nakamura argues in chapter 16 of her 2002 book After/image of identity: Gender, Technology, and Identity Politics, that technology gives us iterations of our age, race and gender in virtual spaces, as opposed to them being fully extinguished. Nakamura uses a metaphor of "after-images" to describe the cultural phenomenon of expressing identity on the internet. The idea is that any performance of identity on the internet is simultaneously present and past-tense, "posthuman and projectionary", due to its immortality.

Doctor Sherry Turkle, professor of Social Studies of Science and Technology at MIT, believes the internet is a place where actions of discrimination are less likely to occur. In her 1995 book Life on the Screen: Identity in the Age of the Internet, she argues that discrimination is easier in reality as it is easier to identify as face value, what is contrary to your norm. The internet allows for a more fluid expression of identity and thus, we become more accepting of inconsistent personae within ourselves and others. For these reasons, Turkle argues users existing in online spaces are less compelled to judge or compare ourselves to our peers, allowing people in virtual settings an opportunity to gain a greater capacity for acknowledging diversity.

Nakamura argues against this view, coining the term Identity Tourism in her 1999 article Race In/For Cyberspace: Identity Tourism and Racial Passing on the Internet. Identity tourism, in the context of cyberspace, is a term used to the describe the phenomenon of users donning and doffing other-race and other-gender personae. Nakamura finds that performed behavior from these identity tourists often perpetuate stereotypes.

In the 1998 book Communities in Cyberspace, authors Marc A. Smith and Peter Kollock, perceives the interactions with strangers are based upon with whom we are speaking or interacting with. Everything from clothes, voice, body language, gestures, and power, we rely on these abilities to identify others, which play a role with how we will speak or interact with them. Smith and Kollock believes that online interactions breaks away of all of the face-to-face gestures and signs that us people tend to show in front of one another. Although this is difficult to do online, it also provides space to play with one’s identity.

Gender 
The gaming community is extremely vast and accessible to a wide variety of people, However, there are negative effects on the relationships 'gamers' have with the medium when expressing identity of gender. Doctor Adrienne Shaw notes in her 2012 article Do you identify as a gamer? Gender, race, sexuality, and gamer identity, that gender, perhaps subconsciously, plays a large role in identifying oneself as a 'gamer.'  Representation in video games have become a problem as it forget the minority of players who are not just the stereotyped white teen male gamer, as there are so many players from different backgrounds who consume these games but aren't being represented.

Types

Internet-based 
The explosive diffusion of the Internet since the mid-1990s fostered the proliferation of virtual communities in the form of social networking services and online communities. Virtual communities may synthesize Web 2.0 technologies with the community, and therefore have been described as Community 2.0, although strong community bonds have been forged online since the early 1970s on timeshare systems like PLATO and later on Usenet. Online communities depend upon social interaction and exchange between users online. This interaction emphasizes the reciprocity element of the unwritten social contract between community members.

Internet message boards

An online message board is a forum where people can discuss thoughts or ideas on various topics or simply express an idea. Users may choose which thread, or board of discussion, they would like to read or contribute to. A user will start a discussion by making a post. Other users who choose to respond can follow the discussion by adding their own posts to that thread at any time. Unlike in spoken conversations, message boards do not usually have instantaneous responses; users actively go to the website to check for responses.

Anyone can register to participate in an online message board. People can choose to participate in the virtual community, even if or when they choose not to contribute their thoughts and ideas. Unlike chat rooms, at least in practice, message boards can accommodate an almost infinite number of users.

Internet users' urges to talk to and reach out to strangers online is unlike those in real-life encounters where people are hesitant and often unwilling to step in to help strangers. Studies have shown that people are more likely to intervene when they are the only one in a situation. With Internet message boards, users at their computers are alone, which might contribute to their willingness to reach out. Another possible explanation is that people can withdraw from a situation much more easily online than off. They can simply click exit or log off, whereas they would have to find a physical exit and deal with the repercussions of trying to leave a situation in real life. The lack of status that is presented with an online identity also might encourage people, because, if one chooses to keep it private, there is no associated label of gender, age, ethnicity or lifestyle.

Online chat rooms

Shortly after the rise of interest in message boards and forums, people started to want a way of communicating with their "communities" in real time. The downside to message boards was that people would have to wait until another user replied to their posting, which, with people all around the world in different time frames, could take a while. The development of online chat rooms allowed people to talk to whoever was online at the same time they were. This way, messages were sent and online users could immediately respond.

The original development by CompuServe CB hosted forty channels in which users could talk to one another in real time. The idea of forty different channels led to the idea of chat rooms that were specific to different topics. Users could choose to join an already existent chat room they found interesting, or start a new "room" if they found nothing to their liking. Real-time chatting was also brought into virtual games, where people could play against one another and also talk to one another through text. Now, chat rooms can be found on all sorts of topics, so that people can talk with others who share similar interests. Chat rooms are now provided by Internet Relay Chat (IRC) and other individual websites such as Yahoo, MSN, and AOL.

Chat room users communicate through text-based messaging. Most chat room providers are similar and include an input box, a message window, and a participant list. The input box is where users can type their text-based message to be sent to the providing server. The server will then transmit the message to the computers of anyone in the chat room so that it can be displayed in the message window. The message window allows the conversation to be tracked and usually places a time stamp once the message is posted. There is usually a list of the users who are currently in the room, so that people can see who is in their virtual community.

Users can communicate as if they are speaking to one another in real life. This "simulated reality" attribute makes it easy for users to form a virtual community, because chat rooms allow users to get to know one another as if they were meeting in real life. The individual "room" feature also makes it more likely that the people within a chat room share a similar interest; an interest that allows them to bond with one another and be willing to form a friendship.

Virtual worlds

Virtual worlds are the most interactive of all virtual community forms. In this type of virtual community, people are connected by living as an avatar in a computer-based world. Users create their own avatar character (from choosing the avatar's outfits to designing the avatar's house) and control their character's life and interactions with other characters in the 3D virtual world. It is similar to a computer game, however there is no objective for the players. A virtual world simply gives users the opportunity to build and operate a fantasy life in the virtual realm. Characters within the world can talk to one another and have almost the same interactions people would have in reality. For example, characters can socialize with one another and hold intimate relationships online.

This type of virtual community allows for people to not only hold conversations with others in real time, but also to engage and interact with others. The avatars that users create are like humans. Users can choose to make avatars like themselves, or take on an entirely different personality than them. When characters interact with other characters, they can get to know one another through text-based talking and virtual experience (such as having avatars go on a date in the virtual world). A virtual community chat room may give real-time conversations, but people can only talk to one another. In a virtual world, characters can do activities together, just like friends could do in reality. Communities in virtual worlds are most similar to real-life communities because the characters are physically in the same place, even if the users who are operating the characters are not. Second Life is one of the most popular virtual worlds on the Internet. Whyville offers a good alternative for younger audiences where safety and privacy are a concern. In Whyville, you use the virtual world's simulation aspect to experiment and learn about various phenomena.

Another use for virtual worlds has been in business communications. Benefits from virtual world technology such as photo realistic avatars and positional sound create an atmosphere for participants that provides a less fatiguing sense of presence. Enterprise controls that allow the meeting host to dictate the permissions of the attendees such as who can speak, or who can move about allow the host to control the meeting environment. Zoom, is a popular platform that has grown over the COVID-19 pandemic. Where those who host meetings on this platform, can dictate who can or cannot speak, by muting or unmuting them, along with who is able to join. Several companies are creating business based virtual worlds including Second Life. These business based worlds have stricter controls and allow functionality such as muting individual participants, desktop sharing, or access lists to provide a highly interactive and controlled virtual world to a specific business or group. Business based virtual worlds also may provide various enterprise features such as Single Sign on with third party providers, or Content Encryption.

Social network services

Social networking services are the most prominent type of virtual community. They are either a website or software platform that focuses on creating and maintaining relationships. Facebook, Twitter, and Instagram are all virtual communities. With these sites, one often creates a profile or account, and adds friends or follow friends. This allows people to connect and look for support using the social networking service as a gathering place. These websites often allow for people to keep up to date with their friends and acquaintances' activities without making much of an effort. On several of these sites you may be able to video chat, with several people at once, making the connections feel more like you are together. On Facebook, for example, one can upload photos and videos, chat, make friends, reconnect with old ones, and join groups or causes.

Specialized information communities
Participatory culture plays a large role in online and virtual communities. In participatory culture, users feel that their contributions are important and that by contributing, they are forming meaningful connections with other users. The differences between being a producer of content on the website and being a consumer on the website become blurred and overlap. According to Henry Jenkins, "Members believe their contributions matter and feel some degree of social connection with one another "(Jenkins, et al. 2005). The exchange and consumption of information requires a degree of "digital literacy", such that users are able to "archive, annotate, appropriate, transform and recirculate media content" (Jenkins). Specialized information communities centralizes a specific group of users who are all interested in the same topic. For example, TasteofHome.com, the website of the magazine Taste of Home, is a specialized information community that focuses on baking and cooking. The users contribute consumer information relating to their hobby and additionally participate in further specialized groups and forums. Specialized Information Communities are a place where people with similar interests can discuss and share their experiences and interests.

Howard Rheingold's study
Howard Rheingold's Virtual Community could be compared with Mark Granovetter's ground-breaking "strength of weak ties" article published twenty years earlier in the American Journal of Sociology. Rheingold translated, practiced and published Granovetter's conjectures about strong and weak ties in the online world. His comment on the first page even illustrates the social networks in the virtual society: "My seven year old daughter knows that her father congregates with a family of invisible friends who seem to gather in his computer. Sometimes he talks to them, even if nobody else can see them. And she knows that these invisible friends sometimes show up in the flesh, materializing from the next block or the other side of the world." (page 1).  Indeed, in his revised version of Virtual Community, Rheingold goes so far to say that had he read Barry Wellman's work earlier, he would have called his book "online social networks".

Rheingold's definition contains the terms "social aggregation and personal relationships" (pp3). Lipnack & Stamps (1997) and Mowshowitz (1997) point out how virtual communities can work across space, time and organizational boundaries; Lipnack & Stamps (1997) mention a common purpose; and Lee, Eom, Jung and Kim (2004) introduce "desocialization" which means that there is less frequent interaction with humans in traditional settings, e.g. an increase in virtual socialization. Calhoun (1991) presents a dystopia argument, asserting the impersonality of virtual networks. He argues that IT has a negative influence on offline interaction between individuals because virtual life takes over our lives. He believes that it also creates different personalities in people which can cause frictions in offline and online communities and groups and in personal contacts. (Wellman & Haythornthwaite, 2002). Recently, Mitch Parsell (2008) has suggested that virtual communities, particularly those that leverage Web 2.0 resources, can be pernicious by leading to attitude polarization, increased prejudices and enabling sick individuals to deliberately indulge in their diseases.

Advantages of Internet communities
Internet communities offer the advantage of instant information exchange that is not possible in a real-life community. This interaction allows people to engage in many activities from their home, such as: shopping, paying bills, and searching for specific information. Users of online communities also have access to thousands of specific discussion groups where they can form specialized relationships and access information in such categories as: politics, technical assistance, social activities, health (see above) and recreational pleasures. Virtual communities provide an ideal medium for these types of relationships because information can easily be posted and response times can be very fast. Another benefit is that these types of communities can give users a feeling of membership and belonging. Users can give and receive support, and it is simple and cheap to use.

Economically, virtual communities can be commercially successful, making money through membership fees, subscriptions, usage fees, and advertising commission. Consumers generally feel very comfortable making transactions online provided that the seller has a good reputation throughout the community. Virtual communities also provide the advantage of disintermediation in commercial transactions, which eliminates vendors and connects buyers directly to suppliers. Disintermediation eliminates pricey mark-ups and allows for a more direct line of contact between the consumer and the manufacturer.

Disadvantages of Internet communities
While instant communication means fast access, it also means that information is posted without being reviewed for correctness. It is difficult to choose reliable sources because there is no editor who reviews each post and makes sure it is up to a certain degree of quality.

In theory, online identities can be kept anonymous which enables people to use the virtual community for fantasy role playing as in the case of Second Life's use of avatars. Some professionals urge caution with users who use online communities because predators also frequent these communities looking for victims who are vulnerable to online identity theft or online predators.

There are also issues still surrounding bullying on internet communities. With users not having to show their face and being behind the camera, people will use threatening and discriminating acts towards other people because they feel that they wouldn't face any consequences.

There are still standing issues with gender and race on the online community as well. Where only the 'normal' people are being represented on the screen, and those of different background and genders are being more displayed, when majority are them are the one's consuming these activities.

See also

 Clan (video games)
 Commons-based peer production
 Community of practice
 Comparison of online dating services
 Cybersectarianism
 Dating search engine
 Digital Altruism
 Dunbar's number
 Global village
 Human-based genetic algorithm
 Immersion (virtual reality)
 Internet activism
 Internet influences on communities
 Internet think tanks
 Learner-generated context
 List of social networking services
 List of virtual communities
 Mass collaboration
 Motivations of Wikipedia contributors
 Music community
 Network of practice
 Online community
 Online community manager
 Online deliberation
 Online ethnography
 Online research community
 Virtual volunteering
 People's Voice Media
 Personal network
 Professional network service
 Social media
 Social web
 Support groups
 The Virtual Community
 Tribe (internet)
 Video game culture
 Virtual airline (hobby)
 Virtual community of practice
 Web of trust

Notes and references

Bibliography

 
 Barzilai, G. (2003). Communities and Law: Politics and Cultures of Legal Identities. Ann Arbor: The University of Michigan Press.
 Else, Liz & Turkle, Sherry. "Living online: I'll have to ask my friends", New Scientist, issue 2569, 20 September 2006. (interview)
 
 Farmer, F. R. (1993). "Social Dimensions of Habitat's Citizenry." Virtual Realities: An Anthology of Industry and Culture, C. Loeffler, ed., Gijutsu Hyoron Sha, Tokyo, Japan
 
 Hafner, K. 2001. The WELL: A Story of Love, Death and Real Life in the Seminal Online Community Carroll & Graf Publishers
 Hagel, J. & Armstrong, A. (1997). Net Gain: Expanding Markets through Virtual Communities. Boston: Harvard Business School Press
 
 Kim, A.J. (2000). Community Building on the Web: Secret Strategies for Successful Online Communities. London: Addison Wesley
 
 Kollock, Peter. 1999. "The Economies of Online Cooperation: Gifts and Public Goods in Cyberspace," in Communities in Cyberspace. Marc Smith and Peter Kollock (editors). London: Routledge.
The author has made available an  
 Kosorukoff, A. & Goldberg, D. E. (2002) Genetic algorithm as a form of organization, Proceedings of Genetic and Evolutionary Computation Conference, GECCO-2002, pp 965–972.
 
 
 
 Naone, Erica, "Who Owns Your Friends?: Social-networking sites are fighting over control of users' personal information.", MIT Technology Review, July/August 2008
 
 
 Preece, J. (2000). Online Communities: Supporting Sociability, Designing Usability. Chichester: John Wiley & Sons Ltd.
 
 Rheingold, H. (2000). The Virtual Community: Homesteading on the Electronic Frontier. London: MIT Press.
 The author has made available an online copy
 
 Seabrook, J. 1997. Deeper: My Two-Year Odyssey in Cyberspace Simon & Schuster
Smith, M. "Voices from the WELL: The Logic of the Virtual Commons" UCLA Department of Sociology.
 Sudweeks, F., McLaughlin, M.L. & Rafaeli, S. (1998) Network and Netplay Virtual Groups on the Internet, MIT Press.
 Portions available online as: Journal of Computer Mediated Communication, 2
 
 Barry Wellman, "An Electronic Group is Virtually a Social Network." Pp. 179–205 in Culture of the Internet, edited by Sara Kiesler. Mahwah, NJ: Lawrence Erlbaum, 1997. Translated into German as "Die elektronische Gruppe als soziales Netzwerk." Pp. 134–67 in Virtuelle Gruppen, edited by Udo Thiedeke. Wiesbaden: Westdeutscher Verlag, 2000.
 Trier, M. (2007) Virtual Knowledge Communities – IT-supported Visualization and Analysis. Saarbrücken, Germany: VDM Verlag Dr. Müller..
 Urstadt, Bryant, "Social Networking Is Not a Business: Web 2.0—the dream of the user-built, user-centered, user-run Internet—has delivered on just about every promise except profit. Will its most prominent example, social networking, ever make any money?", MIT Technology Review, July/August 2008

Virtual reality
Community building
Social information processing
 
Social software
Community